Frederick Lothrop Ames Jr. (July 23, 1876 – June 19, 1921) was a Massachusetts financier and socialite. He was the great-grandson of Oliver Ames, who established the Ames Shovel Company, grandson of Oliver Ames Jr., and son of Frederick Lothrop Ames.

Biography

Family
Frederick Lothrop Ames Jr. was born July 23, 1876, in North Easton, Massachusetts. He was the second son of Frederick Lothrop Ames Sr. and Rebecca Caroline (Blair) Ames, and went by the name "Lothrop." The Ames were fairly prominent in 19th century New England society, and a major presence in small North Easton. Lothrop's father Frederick Sr. was considered by many to be the wealthiest man in Massachusetts. Frederick Sr. died at age 58 in 1893, leaving young Lothrop fatherless and extremely wealthy at age seventeen.

Lothrop received an A.B. degree from Harvard College in 1898. In 1902, he purchased the yacht Vigilant, which had won the America's Cup back in 1893.

He married Edith Callender Cryder, daughter of Duncan Cryder of New York, on May 31, 1904, at Trinity Church in New York City. They had two children, Frederick and Mary.

Business interests
Lothrop had interests in the family shovel business and served on the boards of directors of many companies, including banks, mining companies, railroads, power companies, hospitals, dredging companies, and more. He was involved with the breeding of Guernsey cattle and was a prominent member of the Massachusetts Guernsey Breeders Association.

Lothrop kept an office in the family-owned Ames Building in Boston.

Death
Lothrop took ill on May 1, 1921, had surgery on May 6, appeared to recover on June 11, but died on June 19 at his home in North Easton. His funeral was held June 22 at the Unity Church of North Easton, which his family had attended for many years. He was buried at the Village Cemetery behind the church.

Stone House Hill House
In 1904, shortly after his marriage to Edith, Lothrop commissioned architects Douglas H. Thomas and J. Harleston Parker (later of the firm Parker, Thomas and Rice) to design a mansion on the Easton-Brockton town line. The 50-room “Stone House Hill House” contained a gymnasium with glass-roofed indoor clay tennis court, marble swimming pool, squash court, garage, conservatory, barns and maintenance buildings. The building was completed in 1905.

By 1935, Ames was deceased and Edith remarried; she sold the entire Stone House Hill House and property to the Catholic Congregation of Holy Cross. Between 1935-1948, the congregation used the place as a seminary to educate candidates for the priesthood. In 1948 the Congregation of Holy Cross established Stonehill College on the property.

References

External links
 

1876 births
1921 deaths
American manufacturing businesspeople
Harvard College alumni
Blue Water Medal recipients
Butler–Ames family
People from Easton, Massachusetts